The Northern Amateur Football League, also known as the Northern Amateur League and often simply as the Amateur League, is an association football league in Northern Ireland. It contains 13 divisions. These comprise four intermediate sections: the Premier Division, Division 1A, Division 1B and Division 1C; three junior sections: Division 2A, Division 2B and Division 2C; and six reserve sections.

Clubs in membership (2019–20)

Intermediate

Format 

The league season lasts from August to May with each club playing the others twice, once at their home ground and once at that of their opponents. Teams receive three points for a win and one point for a draw. No points are awarded for a loss. Teams are ranked by total points, then goal difference, and then goals scored. At the end of each season, the team that finishes in first place in the Premier division is crowned league champions.

Premier Division 
There are 14 clubs in the Premier Division, each playing a total of 26 games. The two lowest-placed teams are relegated to Division 1A. The league champions can be promoted to the NIFL Premier Intermediate League, providing they meet the admittance requirements.

Division 1A 
There are 14 clubs. The two highest-placed teams are promoted into the Premier Division whilst the two lowest-placed teams are relegated to Division 1B.

Division 1B 
There are 14 clubs. The two highest-placed teams are promoted to Division 1A and the two lowest-placed teams are relegated to Division 1C.

Division 1C 
This division was added to the Amateur League for the 2009/10 season. It now consists of 14 teams who will each play a total of 26 matches. The two top-placed teams at the end of the season will be promoted to Division 1B.

Second Division
There are three sections within the Second Division, which has junior status: Division 2A, Division 2B and Division 2C. The top team in Division 2A at the end of the season can be promoted into the Intermediate section as long as their grounds meet intermediate standards.

Third Division
The Third Division is for reserve sides of teams in the first and second divisions. It has six sections: 3A to 3F.

Cup competitions
There are two cup competitions at intermediate level: the Border Regiment Cup, more commonly referred to as the Border Cup, the final of which is played during the Christmas period, is a knock-out competition for First Division clubs. The Clarence Cup is a knock-out competition for all clubs (encompassing both the First and Second Divisions).

History 
The League was founded 4 July 1923 at a meeting of fourteen clubs at the Clarence Place Hall, Donegall Square East, Belfast, initially as a league for teams from public bodies, private associations, schools and firms. It was affiliated to the Irish Football Association (IFA) as a junior league in August. The first season was 1923/24 and by the time the first fixtures were played on 22 September, there were 16 member clubs. The Co-operative and C.P.A. were tied at the top of the table, but the Co-operative won a play-off to be crowned the first Amateur League champions.

A knock-out competition – the Clarence Cup – was also inaugurated in the first season, and the first winners were C.P.A., who beat the Co-operative 2–1 in a replay after a 0–0 draw.

The League's first representative game was played on 26 January 1924 against the Minor League at the Oval, and was a 6–1 win for the Amateur League. In 1932, the League played its first representative match outside Northern Ireland: a 3–3 draw against the Scottish Juvenile FA at Celtic Park, Glasgow. This became an annual fixture, which lasted until 1939, only to be halted by the Second World War. Subsequently, annual fixtures have resumed, first with the Scottish Amateur League and, since 1978–1979 with the Scottish Amateur F.A., competing for the Britton Rosebowl.

During the next few years, the League gained intermediate status, and a junior-status second division was added in 1926. By 1930, there were 30 clubs in membership. In 1932–1933, the League's strength was demonstrated when Dunville's became the first Amateur League team to win the Irish Intermediate Cup, and in 1938–1939 when Sirocco Works won the Steel & Sons Cup.

In the 1936–1937 season, a new competition was introduced: the Border Regiment Cup (commonly the Border Cup), which was to become the perhaps League's most prestigious trophy as it established a traditional Christmas final. The cup was presented to the league by the team of the Border Regiment, stationed at Palace Barracks, which had been a member of the League since 1933, and which was nearing the end of its tour of duty. The first winners were Sirocco Works, who beat Whitehouse Recreation Club 4–0 in the final.

After the Second World War, the league expanded its membership and the second division was split into two – Division 2A and Division 2B – in 1947. Division 2C was added in 1950. In 1961, Division 2A was elevated to intermediate status as Division 1B, with the top division renamed as Division 1A. Divisions 2B and 2C consequently became 2A and 2B respectively. The next year, 1962, the league expanded again and a new Division 2C was added, making a total of five divisions.

In 1963, it was decided that the Border Cup should be confined to teams in the First Division, and a new knock-out competition – the Cochrane Corry Cup – was instituted for the Second Division teams. The Clarence Cup is contested by teams of both divisions.

From the 1970–1971 season, automatic promotion and relegation within each division was introduced, and in the following season a new Third Division was added for the reserve teams of member clubs. In 1971 Division 2C was abolished, but re-established again in 1975. In 1973 a second reserve section was formed and the Third Division was thus divided into Division 3A and Division 3B. Division 3C was added in 1980, Division 3D in 1986 and Division 3E in 1991. There is now a Division 3F.

The League had been growing, particularly since the 1960s, and the milestone of 100 teams in membership was achieved in 1981. (By 1997–1998, there were 144 teams in membership.) In 1985, the League secured a sponsorship deal with Smithwick's.

In 1986, the intermediate First Division was expanded into three sections with the addition of Division 1C. From 1991, the intermediate sections were renamed as the Premier Division, Division 1A and Division 1B. Minimum standards were set for clubs' grounds as a condition of membership of the Premier Division, with promotion only available to those clubs whose facilities measured up.

List of champions 

 1923–24 Co-operative
 1924–25 North Cricket Club
 1925–26 North Cricket Club
 1926–27 Sirocco Works
 1927–28 Shaftesbury
 1928–29 Shaftesbury
 1929–30 Holm Factory
 1930–31 Dunville's
 1931–32 Dunville's
 1932–33 Dunville's
 1933–34 Dunville's
 1934–35 Sirocco Works
 1935–36 Sirocco Works
 1936–37 Sirocco Works
 1937–38 Sirocco Works
 1938–39 Sirocco Works
 1939–40 Sirocco Works
 1940–41 Victoria Works 
 1941–42 Victoria Works United
 1942–43 Victoria Works United
 1943–44 Shankill Young Men
 1944–45 Shankill Young Men
 1945–46 Shankill Young Men
 1946–47 Queen's Island Woodworkers
 1947–48 Sirocco Works
 1948–49 Carrick Rangers
 1949–50 East Belfast
 1950–51 Musgrave
 1951–52 Carrick Rangers
 1952–53 East Belfast
 1953–54 East Belfast
 1954–55 East Belfast
 1955–56 East Belfast
 1956–57 Short Brothers & Harland
 1957–58 Short Brothers & Harland
 1958–59 Short Brothers & Harland
 1959–60 Short Brothers & Harland
 1960–61 Albert Foundry [I]
 1961–62 Chimney Corner
 1962–63 East Belfast
 1963–64 East Belfast
 1964–65 St Elizabeth's
 1965–66 East Belfast
 1966–67 Albert Foundry [I]
 1967–68 Islandmagee
 1968–69 Chimney Corner
 1969–70 Chimney Corner
 1970–71 Royal Ulster Constabulary
 1971–72 International Computers Limited
 1972–73 Royal Ulster Constabulary
 1973–74 Chimney Corner
 1974–75 Chimney Corner
 1975–76 Barn United
 1976–77 Downpatrick Rec.
 1977–78 Downpatrick Rec.
 1978–79 Harland & Wolff Welders
 1979–80 Dunmurry Rec
 1980–81 Downpatrick Rec.
 1981–82 Drumaness Mills
 1982–83 Standard Telephones & Cables
 1983–84 Drumaness Mills
 1984–85 Killyleagh Youth
 1985–86 Cromac Albion
 1986–87 Cromac Albion
 1987–88 Dunmurry Rec
 1988–89 Drumaness Mills
 1989–90 Short Brothers
 1990–91 Harland & Wolff Sports
 1991–92 Dunmurry Rec
 1992–93 Killyleagh Youth
 1993–94 East Belfast
 1994–95 Crumlin United
 1995–96 Northern Telecom
 1996–97 Northern Telecom
 1997–98 Ards Rangers
 1998–99 Dunmurry Rec
 1999–00 Killyleagh Youth
 2000–01 Killyleagh Youth
 2001–02 Killyleagh Youth
 2002–03 Killyleagh Youth
 2003–04 Killyleagh Youth
 2004–05 Killyleagh Youth
 2005–06 Newington Youth
 2006–07 Albert Foundry [II]
 2007–08 Downpatrick
 2008–09 Newington Youth
 2009–10 Newington Youth
 2010–11 Newington Youth
 2011–12 Ards Rangers
 2012–13 Newington Youth
 2013–14 Drumaness Mills
 2014–15 Ards Rangers
 2015–16 Immaculata
 2016–17 Crumlin Star
 2017–18 Crumlin Star
 2018–19 Crumlin Star
 2021–22 Rathfriland Rangers

Performance by club 

* Including one as Victoria Works.
** Including two as Shaftesbury.
† Including four as Short Brothers & Harland.
‡ One as Standard Telephones & Cables and two as Northern Telecom.

List of Clarence Cup winners 

 1923–24 CPA
 1924–25 Ophir
 1925–26 Sirocco Works
 1926–27 Sirocco Works
 1927–28 Shaftesbury
 1928–29 Shaftesbury
 1929–30 Shaftesbury
 1930–31 Dunville's
 1931–32 Ewarts
 1932–33 Cliftonville Strollers
 1933–34 49th (Scouts) Old Boys
 1934–35 Border Regiment
 1935–36 Willowfield
 1936–37 Whitehouse Rec
 1937–38 Whitehouse Rec
 1938–39 Sirocco Works
 1939–40 Aircraft Works II
 1940–41 Victoria Works 
 1941–42 Victoria Works United
 1942–43 Victoria Works United
 1943–44 Sirocco Works
 1944–45 Shankill Young Men
 1945–46 Sirocco Works
 1946–47 East Belfast
 1947–48 Sirocco Works
 1948–49 Cogry Mills
 1949–50 East Belfast
 1950–51 East Belfast
 1951–52 East Belfast
 1952–53 Wolfhill Rec
 1953–54 Balmoral Rec
 1954–55 Balmoral Rec
 1955–56 Chimney Corner
 1956–57 East Belfast
 1957–58 Comber Rec
 1958–59 Ewarts
 1959–60 Harland & Wolff S.M.D.
 1960–61 Royal Ulster Constabulary
 1961–62 Comber Rec
 1962–63 Bethel Young Men
 1963–64 Albert Foundry [I]
 1964–65 Lisburn Rangers
 1965–66 St Elizabeth's
 1966–67 Albert Foundry [I]
 1967–68 Dundonald
 1968–69 Harland & Wolff Welders 'A'
 1969–70 Chimney Corner
 1970–71 Cup withheld
 1971–72 RNAY
 1972–73 Lisburn Rangers
 1973–74 Standard Telephones & Cables
 1974–75 Downpatrick Rec.
 1975–76 Barn United
 1976–77 Balmoral Rec
 1977–78 Cromac Albion
 1978–79 Downpatrick Rec.
 1979–80 Cromac Albion
 1980–81 Ballyclare Comrades Reserves
 1981–82 Civil Service
 1982–83 Ballyclare Comrades Reserves
 1983–84 Ballyclare Comrades Reserves
 1984–85 Carreras Rothmans
 1985–86 Standard Telephones & Cables
 1986–87 Harland & Wolff Sports
 1987–88 Grove United
 1988–89 Harland & Wolff Sports
 1989–90 Rooftop
 1990–91 Abbey Villa
 1991–92 Harland & Wolff Sports
 1992–93 Drumaness Mills
 1993–94 Drumaness Mills
 1994–95 Barn United
 1995–96 Cup withheld
 1996–97 Ballynahinch United
 1997–98 Killyleagh Youth
 1998–99 Comber Rec
 1999–2000 ?
 2000–01 Killyleagh Youth
 2001–02 Killyleagh Youth
 2002–03 Bangor Amateurs
 2003–04 Kilmore Rec
 2004–05 Kilmore Rec
 2005–06 Barn United
 2006–07 East Belfast
 2007–08 Islandmagee
 2008–09 Immaculata
 2009–10 Albert Foundry [II]
 2010–11 Immaculata
 2011–12 Derriaghy Cricket Club
 2012–13 Crumlin Star
 2013–14 Drumaness Mills
 2014–15 Immaculata
 2015–16 Immaculata
 2016–17 Immaculata
 2017–18 Crumlin Star
 2018–19 East Belfast

Performance by club

* Including three as Shaftesbury.
** Including one as Victoria Works.

List of Border Cup winners 

Sources:

Performance by club

† includes 1 win by 2nd XI

Sources
H. Johnstone & G. Hamilton (n.d.) A Memorable Milestone: 75 Years of the Northern Amateur Football League
M. Brodie (ed.) (n.d.) The Northern Ireland Soccer Yearbook 1999/2000.
M. Brodie (ed.) (n.d.) The Northern Ireland Soccer Yearbook 2000/01.
M. Brodie (ed.) (n.d.) The Northern Ireland Soccer Yearbook 2001/02.
M. Brodie (ed.) (n.d.) The Northern Ireland Soccer Yearbook 2002/03.
M. Brodie (ed.) (n.d.) The Northern Ireland Soccer Yearbook 2003/04.
M. Brodie (ed.) (n.d.) The Northern Ireland Soccer Yearbook 2004/05.
M. Brodie (ed.) (n.d.) The Northern Ireland Soccer Yearbook 2006/07.
M. Brodie (ed.) (n.d.) The Northern Ireland Soccer Yearbook 2007/08.
M. Brodie (ed.) (n.d.) The Northern Ireland Soccer Yearbook 2008/2009. Belfast:Ulster Tatler Publications
 Newington Youth Club F.C. ''Thursday 14 May 2009– Newington are the champions! Newington Football Club. Retrieved 15–05–09.
 Northern Amateur Football League

Notes

External links 
 The Northern Amateur Football League Official site – (For fixtures, results and tables of all Northern Ireland amateur football)
 nifootball.co.uk – (For fixtures, results and tables of all Northern Ireland amateur football leagues)

 
4
Amateur sport in the United Kingdom
Amateur association football
North
North
1923 establishments in Northern Ireland
Sports leagues established in 1923